The 2012 AdvoCare 500 was a NASCAR Sprint Cup Series stock car race held on September 2, 2012 at Atlanta Motor Speedway in Hampton, Georgia, United States. Contested over 325 laps, it was the twenty-fifth race of the 2012 NASCAR Sprint Cup Series season. Denny Hamlin of Joe Gibbs Racing won the race, his fourth of the season, while Jeff Gordon finished second ahead of Brad Keselowski.

Report

Background

Atlanta Motor Speedway is one of ten intermediate tracks to hold NASCAR races; the others are Charlotte Motor Speedway, Chicagoland Speedway, Darlington Raceway, Homestead Miami Speedway, Kansas Speedway, Kentucky Speedway, Las Vegas Motor Speedway, New Hampshire Motor Speedway, and Texas Motor Speedway. The track's turns are banked at twenty-four degrees, while the front stretch, the location of the finish line, and the back stretch are banked at five.

Before the race, Greg Biffle led the Drivers' Championship with 849 points, and Jimmie Johnson stood in second with 838. Dale Earnhardt Jr. was third in the Drivers' Championship with 834 points, eleven ahead of Matt Kenseth and 37 ahead of Martin Truex Jr. in fourth and fifth. Clint Bowyer with 794 was four ahead of Brad Keselowski, as Denny Hamlin with 774 points, was seven points ahead of Kevin Harvick, and 28 in front of Tony Stewart. In the Manufacturers' Championship, Chevrolet was leading with 167 points, 30 ahead of Toyota. Ford, with 122 points, was twenty points ahead of Dodge in the battle for third. Jeff Gordon was the race's defending champion.

Practice and qualifying

Three practice sessions were held before the Sunday race—one on Friday, August 31, and two on Saturday, September 1. The first session lasted 90 minutes, and the second for 55 minutes. The third and final session finished after 50 minutes.  Truex Jr. was quickest with a time of 29.932 seconds in the first session, less than one tenth of a second faster than Kyle Busch. Stewart was just off Busch's pace, followed by Keselowski, Kasey Kahne, and Bowyer. Kenseth was seventh, still within four tenths of a second of Truex's time.

Forty-seven cars were entered for qualifying, but only forty-three could qualify for the race because of NASCAR's qualifying procedure. Stewart clinched the fourteenth pole position of his career, with a time of 29.787 seconds. He was joined on the front row of the grid by Biffle. Kyle Busch qualified third, Kenseth took fourth, and Gordon started fifth. Mark Martin, Hamlin, Johnson, Joey Logano and Marcos Ambrose rounded out the top ten. The four drivers that failed to qualify for the race were Michael McDowell, Josh Wise, Stephen Leicht and Mike Bliss. Once the qualifying session concluded, Stewart stated, "That pole is 100 percent due to Ryan Newman. I'm not sure if we'd have run the line I'd planned on running we'd have been that fast. It's awesome having a teammate like that. I don't ever remember being here and seeing anybody run up at the top like he did."

In the second practice session, Biffle was quickest with a time of 30.629 seconds. Kenseth, with a time of 30.675, was second-quickest, ahead of Earnhardt Jr., Truex Jr., and Bowyer. Gordon, Hamlin, Kyle Busch, Johnson, and Keselowski completed the first ten positions. Kenseth was scored quickest through the third practice session with a time of 30.653, 0.022 seconds faster than his fastest lap during the second session. Gordon was second-quickest in the session, while Hamlin was scored third. Kyle Busch followed in the fourth position ahead of Biffle, Keselowski and Stewart. Truex Jr., Martin and Juan Pablo Montoya rounded out the first ten positions in eighth, ninth and tenth, respectively.

Race
The race, the 25th in the season, began at 7:30 p.m. EDT and was televised live in the United States on ESPN. Hamlin won the race over second-placed Gordon after coming off of pit lane in the first position during the final caution for Jamie McMurray's crash on the front stretch.

Standings after the race

Drivers' Championship standings

Manufacturers' Championship standings

Note: Only the first ten positions are included for the driver standings.
* This driver clinched a position in the Chase for the Sprint Cup.

References

NASCAR races at Atlanta Motor Speedway
AdvoCare 500
AdvoCare 500
AdvoCare 500